Mozammel Haque may refer to:

 Mozammel Haque (Bangladesh Nationalist Party politician), Sirajganj District
 Mozammel Haque (Bangladesh Awami League politician) (born 1946)
Mozammel Haque (Natore politician), Bangladesh Nationalist Party
ASM Mozammel Haque (Bangladesh Jamaat-e-Islami politician),  Jhenaidah District
Mozammel Haque (NAP (Muzzafar) politician), Brahmanbaria District